Czechoslovakia competed at the 1964 Winter Olympics in Innsbruck, Austria.

Medalists

Alpine skiing

Men

Men's slalom

Cross-country skiing

Men

Women

Women's 3 x 5 km relay

Figure skating

Men

Women

Pairs

Ice hockey

First round
Winners (in bold) qualified for the Group A to play for 1st-8th places. Teams, which lost their qualification matches, played in Group B for 9th-16th places.

|}

Medal round 

Czechoslovakia 11-1 Germany (UTG)
USSR 7-5 Czechoslovakia
Czechoslovakia 4-0 Finland
Czechoslovakia 5-1 Switzerland
Czechoslovakia 7-1 USA
Czechoslovakia 3-1 Canada
Sweden 8-3 Czechoslovakia

Leading scorers

Luge

Men

(Men's) Doubles

Women

Nordic combined 

Events:
 normal hill ski jumping (Three jumps, best two counted and shown here.)
 15 km cross-country skiing

Ski jumping 

Athletes performed three jumps, the best two were counted and are shown here.

Speed skating

Men

Women

References
Official Olympic Reports
International Olympic Committee results database
 Olympic Winter Games 1964, full results by sports-reference.com

Nations at the 1964 Winter Olympics
1964
Winter Olympics